Chasing the Dragon, previously known as King of Drug Dealers, is a Hong Kong-Chinese action crime drama film directed by Wong Jing and Jason Kwan. The film stars Donnie Yen as Crippled Ho, based on real life gangster Ng Sik-ho and Andy Lau reprising his role as Lee Rock from the film series of the same name. The film is about an illegal immigrant from Hong Kong who sneaks into  British-colonized Hong Kong in 1963 and transforms himself into a ruthless and emerging drug lord.
 The film is a remake of the 1991 film To Be Number One.

Chasing the Dragon II: Wild Wild Bunch, a sequel-in-name-only featuring new characters and a new storyline was released in June 2019.

Cast

 Donnie Yen as Crippled Ho (跛豪; based on Ng Sik-ho)
 Andy Lau (special appearance) as Lee Rock (雷洛; based on Lui Lok)
 Bryan Larkin as Ernest Hunter, a corrupt British policeman and the main antagonist of the film
 Kent Cheng as Piggy
 Philip Keung as Wil
 Wilfred Lau as Wayne
 Yu Kang as Chad
 Kent Tong as Tong
 Michelle Hu as Jane
 Raquel Xu as Rose
 Felix Wong as Jan
 Ben Ng as Chubby
 Julian Gaertner  as Translator Geoff, the right hand of Ernest Hunter
 Niki Chow as May, Ho's deceased wife
 Philip Ng as Wai Man
 Jonathan Lee as Peter
 Lawrence Chou as Willy
 Wang Qianyu as Cheryl
 Kenneth Tsang as Sir Chow
 Michael Chan as Master Dane
 Ricky Wong as Grizzly Bear
 Xia Qing as Grizzly Bear's wife
 Han Xinyi as Snake Dancer
 Terence Yin as Tong's brother
 Jason Wong as Comic

Production and release
Director Wong Jing personally flew to Canada in 2016 to persuade Yen to star in his film Chasing the Dragon, while Yen was filming XXX: Return of Xander Cage at that time. Yen was convinced by Wong's sincerity, playing a non-traditional role of a villain with limited fighting scenes and the opportunity to work alongside Andy Lau. Yen flew back to Asia to take part in the film after filming Return of Xander Cage in 2016.

In September 2017, Chasing the Dragon was released to mixed reviews from critics. It was a huge hit with audiences in most Mandarin-speaking parts of Asia (including China and Singapore), beating Hollywood blockbuster Blade Runner 2049 and Jackie Chan's The Foreigner, despite being marketed less heavily. In Hong Kong, Chasing the Dragon earned more than 10 times the box office gross of The Foreigner. In China, it earned .

Chasing the Dragon was released as a digital, Blu-ray and DVD combo pack on January 23, 2018.

Awards and nominations

References

External links 
 
 
 
 
 
 
 
 

2017 films
2017 crime drama films
Hong Kong crime action films
Hong Kong action films
Remakes of Hong Kong films
Chinese crime drama films
Remakes of Chinese films
2017 crime action films
2017 action drama films
Police detective films
Triad films
2010s Cantonese-language films
Films produced by Andy Lau
Films about the illegal drug trade
Films directed by Wong Jing
Films set in the 1960s
Films set in the 1970s
Films set in Hong Kong
Films shot in Hong Kong
2010s police films
2017 directorial debut films
2010s Hong Kong films